Chiusano di San Domenico is a town and comune in the province of Avellino, Campania, southern Italy.

History
Human presence in Chiusano can be traced to the times of Ancient Rome based on the discovery of coins, pottery, and tombs. During the 11th century the Lombards ruled the area and life in Chiusano centered on a castle that was constructed on nearby Monte Domenico.

Main sights
Church of Santa Maria degli Angeli (1710)
Confraternity of the Blessed Sacrament of the Rosary (1712)
the Hermitage of Santa Maria Valley (1230).

References

Cities and towns in Campania